SKF-89976A is an anticonvulsant, acting as a GABA reuptake inhibitor via blockade of GAT-1.

References

External links
Tiagabine, SK&F 89976-A, CI-966, and NNC-711 are selective for the cloned GABA transporter GAT-1

Anticonvulsants
GABA reuptake inhibitors